Mofazzal Hossain is a politician from the Rangpur District of Bangladesh and an elected a member of parliament from Rangpur-3.

Career 
Mofazzal was elected to parliament from Rangpur-3 as an independent candidate in 1988. He was defeated from Rangpur-3 constituency in June 1996 on the nomination of independent candidate.

References 

Living people
Year of birth missing (living people)
Possibly living people
People from Rangpur District
Jatiya Party politicians
4th Jatiya Sangsad members